DriveNow was a one-way carsharing service wholly owned by the automotive manufacturer BMW. 
In 2019, DriveNow and car2go, a carsharing service from Daimler AG, merged to form the global mobility provider Share Now, with a combined fleet of 20,000 vehicles in 31 cities in 14 countries and over four million members worldwide. Share Now is one of the five mobility services which are part of the mobility joint venture of the BMW Group and the Daimler AG.

DriveNow service began in Munich, Germany in June 2011. As of October 2017, DriveNow operated over 6,000 vehicles in nine European countries. Apart from five cities in Germany - Berlin, Hamburg, Munich, Düsseldorf, and Cologne - DriveNow is available in Vienna, Copenhagen, Brussels, Milan, Helsinki and Lisbon. In October 2017, the company reached the milestone of one million customers. 

DriveNow operated a fleet comprising only vehicles manufactured by subsidiaries of BMW Group including various MINI models (3 and 5 door, Convertible, Clubman, Countryman) as well as BMW X1, X2, i3, 1 series, and 2 series.

Created as a joint venture between BMW Group and the car rental company Sixt SE holding 50% of shares each, DriveNow became a wholly owned subsidiary of BMW in March 2018. On 29 January 2018, BMW announced that Sixt SE had agreed to sell its 50% stake for c. €209 million. In April 2018, BMW Group and Daimler AG agreed to combine their mobility services, including their car sharing devices DriveNow and car2go, to shape sustainable urban mobility for the future. 

A similar BMW service, ReachNow, was offered in North American cities from April 2016 to July 2019, in Seattle, Washington, Portland, Oregon and Brooklyn, New York. In contrast to DriveNow, ReachNow's technology platform was provided by RideCell rather than Sixt.

Operation

Cities
The following table details all cities where DriveNow operated:

One-way car sharing model

In contrast to classic car rental, where a vehicle is rented at a designated location and typically returned after one or more days, one-way carsharing models allows the use of freely parked vehicles in the city area, or business area. Vehicles can be found and rented through an app on the phone. Driving charge is by a minute rate that ranges between 0.24 to 0.57 per minute depending on the vehicle and business area. The price includes fuel, parking, and insurance. DriveNow also offers packages to make the per minute rate cheaper. Vehicles can be parked back anywhere in the business area of the city. Typically, the car must be parked in the same city as it was rented. The exception is in Düsseldorf and Cologne.

App
An app for mobile devices allow users to locate and reserve vehicles. When reserving a car online, the customers are able to see the car's fuel gauge (gasoline-powered cars) or the battery's state of charge (electric-powered cars), so if the customer wants to go for an extended drive, they can find the right car for that trip. Cars can also be opened and closed through the app.

Vehicles

DriveNow operates a variety of gasoline-powered and diesel BMW 1 Series, BMW 2 Series, BMW X2 series, BMW X1, Mini Countryman, Mini Clubman, Mini Convertible and Mini Cooper vehicles as well the electric-powered BMW i3 and BMW ActiveE. In the San Francisco Bay Area, DriveNow deployed a fleet of 70 BMW ActiveE electric cars by July 2015.

Electric driving
DriveNow Electric Driving with BMW i3
DriveNow offers the largest electric car sharing fleet in the world, using BMW i3, BMW i3 Rex, and BMW Active E. Since 15 July 2015, a total of 724 full-electric BMW i3s have been in regular operation in the fleets of Berlin (130 vehicles), Hamburg, Cologne / Düsseldorf  and Munich. The BMW ActiveE in Berlin and Munich were thus replaced. In London, DriveNow offered the BMW i3 from May 2015 till closure and could thus benefit from tax relief. In Copenhagen, DriveNow launched a purely electric fleet of 400 vehicles in September 2015.

References

External links
Official website

German companies established in 2011
BMW
Car rental companies of Germany
Free-floating carsharing
Transport companies established in 2011
Transport companies disestablished in 2019
German companies disestablished in 2019